Docking is a Canadian short film, directed by Trevor Anderson and released in 2019. Mostly wordless apart from a brief introductory narration by Anderson, the film metaphorically explores his fears and insecurities about dating as a gay man through the depiction of a large penis flying alone through space until meeting another penis and docking with it.

Anderson worked with production designer Todd Cherniawsky and make-up artist Christien Tinsley to create the film. The score was composed by Lyle Bell, Anderson's bandmate in The Wet Secrets. Anderson has described the film as an attempt to push the boundaries of non-fiction filmmaking, by reducing the element of personal essay and increasing the element of cinematic fantasia; however, he has also acknowledged that he had some difficulty convincing arts funders that the film was meant as a serious artistic statement and not just a five-minute dick joke.

The film premiered at the 2019 Sundance Film Festival. In December 2019, the film was named to the Toronto International Film Festival's annual year-end Canada's Top Ten list for short films.

The film received a Canadian Screen Award nomination for Best Animated Short Film at the 8th Canadian Screen Awards in 2020.

References

External links

2019 short documentary films
Canadian animated short films
Canadian LGBT-related short films
2019 LGBT-related films
2019 films
2010s animated short films
2010s English-language films
2010s Canadian films
Films directed by Trevor Anderson
Canadian animated documentary films
Canadian short documentary films